Bartolomeo Giuliano (Susa (Turin), 1825 — Milan, 1909) was an Italian painter.

Biography
Giuliano studied at the Albertina Academy in Turin and began presenting works on historical and literary subjects at the local Promotrice exhibitions in 1846. He was appointed assistant professor of figure drawing in Turin alongside Enrico Gamba in 1855 and then held the same position with Raffaele Casnédi in Milan, where he moved in 1860. He took part in the Esposizione Nazionale di Firenze in 1861 in Florence and became a regular participant in exhibitions in Turin and Milan with works on religious subjects, landscapes and genre scenes. He decorated the lunettes of the dome of the Galleria Vittorio Emanuele II in Milan with allegorical frescoes of Asia and Industry in 1866, but these were replaced shortly afterwards with the present mosaics. He presented views of the coast of Liguria at the Universal Exhibition of 1878 in Paris and in Venice at the Esposizione Internazionale d’Arte in 1895 and 1897. He also took part in the Esposizione Nazionale di Milano in 1906.

References
 Laura Casone, Bartolomeo Giuliano, online catalogue Artgate by Fondazione Cariplo, 2010, CC BY-SA (source for the first revision of this article).

Other projects

Painters from Turin
19th-century Italian painters
Italian male painters
20th-century Italian painters
20th-century Italian male artists
Accademia Albertina alumni
1825 births
1909 deaths
19th-century Italian male artists